The 2016 SEAT León Eurocup was the sixth and final season of the SEAT León Eurocup.

Teams and drivers

Race calendar and results

Championship standings

 Note: Maurits Sandberg was awarded 5 points for his 8th place finish in Silverstone race 2.

References

External links

SEAT León Eurocup seasons
SEAT Leon Eurocup
SEAT Leon Eurocup